Bellavista is a village in Tuscany, central Italy, administratively a frazione of the comune of Poggibonsi, province of Siena. At the time of the 2001 census its population was 1,327.

Bellavista is about 28 km from Siena and 5 km from Poggibonsi.

References 

Frazioni of Poggibonsi